Enrico Fermi Nuclear Power Plant was a nuclear power plant at Trino (often referred to as ‘Trino Vercellese’, meaning ‘Trino in the Province of Vercelli’), in north-west Italy.

Consisting of one 260 megawatt pressurized water reactor (PWR) from the vendor Westinghouse Electric Corporation, it operated from 1964 until 1990. Trino was in 1964 the third ever commercially operated PWR worldwide, and it had the second highest megawatt-capacity of them. It was closed down following the Italian nuclear power referendum, 1987.

The experimental enrichment plant, EUREX, near the power plant,  was closed down in 1984.

External links 

 Nuclear power in Italy at the WNA site.

Nuclear power stations using pressurized water reactors
Former nuclear power stations in Italy
Trino
Buildings and structures in Piedmont